"Paranoid Eyes" is a song from Pink Floyd's 1983 album The Final Cut. This song was one of several to be considered for the band's "best of" album Echoes: The Best of Pink Floyd.

Personnel
 Roger Waters – vocals, bass guitar, acoustic guitar

with:

 Michael Kamen – piano and orchestrations
 Andy Bown – organ
 Ray Cooper – percussion
 National Philharmonic Orchestra – brass and string instruments

References

1983 songs
Pink Floyd songs
Songs written by Roger Waters
Song recordings produced by Roger Waters